The women's Super Heavyweight (over 70 kg/154 lbs) Low-Kick category at the W.A.K.O. World Championships 2007 in Belgrade was the heaviest of the female Low-Kick tournaments, involving just five fighters from three continents (Europe, Asia and Africa).  Each of the matches was three rounds of two minutes each and were fought under Low-Kick rules.    

Due to the low levels of contestants, unsuitable for an eight-person tournament, three women had byes through to the semi finals.  Poland's Paulina Biec won the gold medal defeating Serbian Olivera Milanovic in the final by unanimous decision.  Defeated semi finalists Aigul Kozhagaliyeva from Kazakhstan and Benita Muller from South Africa won bronze medals.

Results

Key

See also
List of WAKO Amateur World Championships
List of WAKO Amateur European Championships
List of female kickboxers

References

External links
 WAKO World Association of Kickboxing Organizations Official Site

Kickboxing events at the WAKO World Championships 2007 Belgrade
2007 in kickboxing
Kickboxing in Serbia